The West-coast laterite ctenotus (Ctenotus fallens)  is a species of skink found in Western Australia.

References

fallens
Reptiles described in 1974
Taxa named by Glen Milton Storr